The 2017 APIA Leichhardt Tigers FC season is the club's second season in the National Premier Leagues (NSW) and in the top league of NPL NSW, National Premier Leagues NSW Men's 1.

Players

Squad information

Transfers in

Transfers out

Technical staff

Statistics

Squad statistics

Friendlies

Competitions

National Premier Leagues NSW

Results summary

Results by round

Matches

Finals

FFA Cup

Matches

Waratah Cup

Matches

References

External links
 Official Website

2017 in Australian soccer
History of sport in Australia